The Cascade River is a river of the South Island of New Zealand. From the end of this valley it turns west to cross a low-lying swampy floodplain before entering the Tasman Sea close to Cascade Point, a headland halfway between Big Bay and Jackson Bay.

See also
List of rivers of New Zealand

References
Land Information New Zealand - Search for Place Names

Rivers of the West Coast, New Zealand
Westland District
Mount Aspiring National Park
Rivers of New Zealand